Oscar Levant (December 27, 1906August 14, 1972) was an American concert pianist, composer, conductor, author, radio game show panelist, television talk show host, comedian and actor. He was awarded a star on the Hollywood Walk of Fame for recordings featuring his piano performances. He was equally famous for his mordant character and witticisms, on the radio and later in movies and television, as for his music.

Early life
Levant was born in Pittsburgh, Pennsylvania, United States, in 1906, to Orthodox Jewish parents who had emigrated from Russia. His father, Max, was a watchmaker who wanted his four sons to become either dentists or doctors. His mother Annie was a highly religious woman whose father was a Rabbi who presided over his daughter's wedding to Max Levant.

Oscar Levant moved to New York in 1922, following the death of his father. He began studying under Zygmunt Stojowski, a well-established piano pedagogue. In 1925, aged 18, he appeared with Ben Bernie in a short film, Ben Bernie and All the Lads, made in New York City in the De Forest Phonofilm sound-on-film system.

Career
Levant traveled to Hollywood in 1928, where his career took a turn for the better. During his stay, he met and befriended George Gershwin. From 1929 to 1948, he composed the music for more than twenty movies. During this period, he also wrote or co-wrote numerous popular songs that made the Hit Parade, the most noteworthy being "Blame It on My Youth" (1934), now considered a standard.

Levant began composing seriously around 1932. He studied under Arnold Schoenberg and impressed him sufficiently to be offered an assistantship (which he turned down, considering himself unqualified). His formal studies led to a request by Aaron Copland to play at the Yaddo Festival of contemporary American music on April 30 of that year. Successful, Levant began composing a new orchestral work, a sinfonietta.

Levant made his debut as a music conductor in 1938 on Broadway, filling in for his brother Harry in sixty-five performances of George S. Kaufman and Moss Hart’s The Fabulous Invalid. In 1939, he was again working on Broadway as composer and conductor of The American Way, another Kaufman and Hart production. He was a talented pianist who recorded works by Gershwin, for which he was well known, and numerous classical composers, and for a portion of the 1940s, he was the highest paid concert pianist in the United States.

At this time, Levant was becoming known to American audiences as one of the regular panelists on the radio quiz show Information Please. Originally scheduled as a guest panelist, Levant proved so quick-witted and popular that he became a regular fixture on the show in the late-1930s and 1940s, along with fellow panelists Franklin P. Adams and John Kieran and moderator Clifton Fadiman. "Mr. Levant," as he was always called, was often challenged with musical questions, and he impressed audiences with his depth of knowledge and facility with a joke. Kieran praised Levant as having a "positive genius for making offhand cutting remarks that couldn't have been sharper if he'd honed them a week in his mind. Oscar was always good for a bright response edged with acid." Examples include "I knew Doris Day before she was a virgin," "I think a lot of [conductor/composer Leonard] Bernstein—but not as much as he does," and (after Marilyn converted to Judaism when she married playwright Arthur Miller), "Now that Marilyn Monroe is kosher, Arthur Miller can eat her.” 

Levant appeared in feature films, starting from the 1920s until the mid-50, often playing a pianist or composer. He had supporting roles in the Metro-Goldwyn-Mayer musicals The Barkleys of Broadway (1949), starring Fred Astaire and Ginger Rogers; An American in Paris (1951), starring Gene Kelly; and The Band Wagon (1953), starring Astaire and Cyd Charisse.

Oscar Levant regularly appeared on NBC radio's Kraft Music Hall, starring singer Al Jolson. He not only accompanied Jolson on the piano with classical and popular songs, but often joked and ad-libbed with Jolson and his guests. This included comedy sketches. Their individual ties to George Gershwin—Jolson introduced Gershwin's "Swanee"—undoubtedly had much to do with their rapport. Both Levant and Jolson appeared as themselves in the Gershwin biopic Rhapsody in Blue (1945).

In the early 1950s, Levant was an occasional panelist on the NBC radio and television game show Who Said That?, in which celebrities would try to determine the speaker of quotations taken from recent news reports.

Levant hosted a talk show on KCOP-TV in Los Angeles from 1958 and 1960, The Oscar Levant Show, which was later syndicated. It featured his piano playing along with monologues and interviews with guests such as Fred Astaire and Linus Pauling. Full recordings of only two shows are known to have survived, one with Astaire, who paid to have a kinescope recording of the broadcast made so that he could assess his performance.

Levant was awarded a star on the Hollywood Walk of Fame in 1960, in recognition of his recording career.

Personal life

Levant was married to and divorced from actress Barbara Woodell in 1932. In 1939, Levant married his second wife, singer and actress June Gale (née Doris Gilmartin), one of the Gale Sisters. They were married for 33 years, until he died in 1972; the couple had three daughters: Marcia, Lorna, and Amanda.

Levant talked openly on television about his neuroses and hypochondria. Years before Levant's first television appearance, Alexander Woollcott said of him: "There isn't anything the matter with Levant that a few miracles wouldn't cure." Despite his afflictions, Levant was considered a multifaceted genius by some. He himself wisecracked "There's a fine line between genius and insanity. I have erased this line." In later life Levant became addicted to prescription drugs, was frequently committed to psychiatric hospitals by his wife, and increasingly withdrew from the limelight.

Actor John Garfield used Levant as a model when creating the character of troubled genius Mickey Dolen in the highly acclaimed 1938 film Four Daughters.

He was the inspiration for the neurotic, womanizing pianist Henry Orient in Nora Johnson's novel and subsequent Hollywood film The World of Henry Orient (1964).

Death

Levant, a lifelong heavy smoker and longtime pharmaceutical drug user, died at home in Beverly Hills, California, of a heart attack in 1972 at age 65. He was discovered by his wife June when she called him from their bedroom to meet for an interview with Candice Bergen, who was then a photojournalist. According to Bergen's memoir titled Knock Wood, she had visited Levant on the previous day; Knock Wood includes one of her photographs from that occasion. In the book, Bergen reveals that Levant had asked her to return the next day to take more photographs, and she agreed. She drove over with her camera on the following day, not realizing he had died.

Levant is interred in the Pierce Brothers Westwood Village Memorial Park Cemetery in Los Angeles. An apocryphal story about Levant is the old joke that his epitaph reads, "I told them I was ill." In reality, the plaque on his crypt states his name, dates of birth / death and nothing else.

Filmography
 Ben Bernie and All the Lads (1925) as himself (a De Forest phonofilm)
 The Dance of Life (1929) as Jerry Evans
 Night Parade (1929) as Ann Pennington's piano accompanist (uncredited)
 In Person (1935)
 Charlie Chan at the Opera (1936) (composed music for film's opera)
 Rhythm on the River (1940) as Billy Starbuck
 Kiss the Boys Goodbye (1941) as Dick Rayburn aka Oscar
 Rhapsody in Blue (1945) as himself
 Humoresque (1946) as Sid Jeffers
 You Were Meant for Me (1948) as Oscar Hoffman
 Romance on the High Seas (1948) as Oscar Farrar (first Doris Day film)
 The Barkleys of Broadway (1949) as Ezra Millar
 An American in Paris (1951) as Adam Cook, bohemian pianist
 O. Henry's Full House (1952) as Bill Peoria (The Ransom of Red Chief)
 The I Don't Care Girl (1953) as Charles Bennett
 The Band Wagon (1953) as Lester Marton, based on Adolph Green
 The Cobweb (1955) as Mr. Capp
 The Oscar Levant Show (1958–1960, TV series)
 Jack Benny Program (1958, TV Series) as himself
 The Tonight Show hosted by Jack Paar (early 1960's)
 The Joey Bishop Show (1964, TV series) as himself
 Merv Griffin Show (1965, TV series) as himself

Quotations
Another example of his repartée:
"It's not what you are; it's what you don't become that hurts."

Broadway
Burlesque (1927) – musical play – performer
Ripples (1930) – musical – co-composer
Sweet and Low (1930) – musical revue – songwriter
The Fabulous Invalid (1938) – musical play – replacement conductor
The American Way (1939) – musical play – conductor and composer

Memoirs
 A Smattering of Ignorance, New York : Doubleday, 1940
 The Memoirs of an Amnesiac, New York : Putnam's, 1965
 The Unimportance of Being Oscar,  New York : Putnam's, 1968

Notes

References
 Sam Kashner and Nancy Schoenberger, A Talent For Genius: the Life and Times of Oscar Levant (Villard/Random House, 1994; Silman-James Press, 1998) 
 Dr. Charles Barber. "The Concert Music of Oscar Levant". Department of Music, Stanford University, 1998–2000
 Caleb T. Boyd. Oscar Levant: Pianist, Gershwinite, Middlebrow Media Star. PhD diss., Washington University in St. Louis, 2020.

External links

 
 
 Oscar Levant recordings at the Discography of American Historical Recordings.
  June Gale IMDb profile; accessed January 8, 2014.
  Levant at Classical Net
  Ben Bernie and All the Lads (1924), a film featuring Levant as pianist, made in Phonofilm process by Lee de Forest in New York City
  Web biography
  featuring Fred Astaire
 1926 performance of La Cinquantaine with Levant on piano
 Levant conducts, and applauds, himself – in a clip from An American in Paris performing Gershwin's Concerto in F

1906 births
1972 deaths
20th-century classical composers
20th-century classical pianists
20th-century American composers
20th-century American pianists
20th-century American comedians
20th-century American male musicians
20th-century American male actors
American classical composers
American classical pianists
American male pianists
American male comedians
American male classical composers
American people of Russian-Jewish descent
Classical musicians from Pennsylvania
Jewish American classical composers
Jewish classical pianists
Jewish American male actors
Jewish American male comedians
Male classical pianists
Male actors from Pittsburgh
Pupils of Arnold Schoenberg
Burials at Westwood Village Memorial Park Cemetery
Hypochondriacs